In Western musical notation, a dotted note is a note with a small dot written after it. In modern practice, the first dot increases the duration of the basic note by half (the original note with an extra beam) of its original value. This means that a dotted note is equivalent to writing the basic note tied to a note of half the value – for instance, a dotted half note is equivalent to a half note tied to a quarter note. Subsequent dots add progressively halved value, as shown in the example to the right.

The use of dotted notes dates back at least to the 10th century, but the exact amount of lengthening a dot provides in early music contexts may vary.  Mensural notation uses a dot of division to clarify ambiguities about its context-dependent interpretation of rhythmic values, sometimes alongside the dot of augmentation as described above. In the gregorian chant editions of Solesmes, a dot is typically interpreted as a doubling of length (see also Neume). 

A pattern using longer notes alternating with shorter notes is sometimes called a dotted rhythm, whether or not it is written as such. Historical examples of music [[performance practice]s using unequal rhythms include notes inégales and swing. The precise performance of dotted rhythms can be a complex issue. Even in notation that employs dots, their performed values may be longer or shorter than the dot mathematically indicates, practices known as over-dotting or under-dotting..

Notation
If the note to be dotted is on a space, the dot also goes on the space, while if the note is on a line, the dot goes on the space above (this also goes for notes on ledger lines).

The placement of dots gets more complicated for adjacent-note chords and for lower voices, as shown below.

The dots on dotted notes, which are located to the right of the note, should not be confused with the dots for staccato articulation, which are located above or below the note.

Theoretically, any note value can be dotted, as can rests of any value. If the rest is in its normal position, dots are always placed in third staff space from the bottom, as shown in the example below. Dotted rests are much less common than dotted notes, unless the dotted value is equal to the beat in compound meter.

In Baroque music, dotted notation was sometimes used to indicate triplet rhythms when it seemed obvious.

Dots can be used across barlines, such as in H. C. Robbins Landon's edition of Joseph Haydn's Symphony No. 70 in D major, but most writers today regard this usage as obsolete and recommend using a tie across the barline instead.

Double dotting

A double-dotted note is a note with two small dots written after it. Its duration is  times its basic note value. The double-dotted note is used less frequently than the dotted note. Typically, as in the example to the right, it is followed by a note whose duration is one-quarter the length of the basic note value, completing the next higher note value. Before the mid-18th century, double dots were not used. Until then, in some circumstances, single dots could mean double dots.

In a French overture (and sometimes other Baroque music), notes written as dotted notes are often interpreted to mean double-dotted notes, and the following note is commensurately shortened; see Historically informed performance.

Triple dotting

A triple-dotted note is a note with three dots written after it; its duration is  times its basic note value. Use of a triple-dotted note value is not common in the Baroque and Classical periods, but quite common in the music of Richard Wagner and Anton Bruckner, especially in their brass parts.

An example of the use of double- and triple-dotted notes is in Frédéric Chopin's Prelude in G major for piano, Op. 28, No. 3. The piece, in common time, contains running semiquavers (sixteenth notes) in the left hand. Several times during the piece Chopin asks for the right hand to play a triple-dotted minim (half note), lasting 15 semiquavers, simultaneously with the first left-hand semiquaver, then one semiquaver simultaneously with the 16th left-hand semiquaver.

Beyond three 

	
Though theoretically possible, a note with more than three dots is highly uncommon; only quadruple dots have been attested. If the original note is considered as being of length 1, then a quintuple dot would only be 1/32 longer than the quadruple dotted note. The difficulty may be seen by comparing dotted notation to tied notation: a quarter note is equivalent to 2 tied eighth notes, a dotted quarter = 3 tied eighth notes, double dotted = 7 tied sixteenth notes, triple dotted = 15 tied thirty-second notes, and quadruple dotted = 31 tied sixty-fourth notes. Although shorter notes do occur, sixty-fourth notes are considered the shortest practical duration found in musical notation.

{| class="wikitable"
|+Base note duration = 1
|-
|
! Undotted
! 1 dot
! 2 dots
! 3 dots
! 4 dots
|-
! Lengthens
| N/A
|  
|  
|  
|  
|-
! Decimal result
| 
| 
| 
| 
| 
|-
! Fractional result
| 
| 
| 
| 
| 
|}

Other contexts 
The pseudonym "Dotted Crotchet" was used by the journalist and editor of The Musical Times, Frederick George Edwards in that journal. Under this name he wrote "educationally suggestive interviews with musical celebrities", as well as a many articles about "cathedrals, churches, and educational institutions".

See also

Tuplet

Notes and references
Notes

References

Sources

External links

 "Learn to Read Drum Music – Part 6 – Dotted Notes Explained", thenewdrummer.com

Note values